Pavol Rybár (born 12 October 1971 in Skalica, Czechoslovakia) was a Slovak professional ice hockey goaltender who played in HC Slovan Bratislava in the Slovak Extraliga.  He played for Slovakia at the 2002 Winter Olympics.

External links
Profile at HC Slovan website

Eliteprospects profile

1971 births
Living people
HC Slovan Bratislava players
Ice hockey players at the 1998 Winter Olympics
Ice hockey players at the 2002 Winter Olympics
Olympic ice hockey players of Slovakia
Sportspeople from Skalica
Slovak expatriate ice hockey players in Russia
Slovak ice hockey goaltenders
Czechoslovak ice hockey goaltenders
Slovak expatriate sportspeople in Belarus
Slovak expatriate ice hockey players in the Czech Republic
Expatriate ice hockey players in Belarus